Gregory John "Gregg" Hansford (8 April 1952 –  5 March 1995) was an Australian professional motorcycle and touring car racer. He competed in the FIM Grand Prix motorcycle racing world championships from 1978 to 1981 and in Australian touring car championships from 1982 to 1994. Hansford was a two-time vice-champion in the 250cc road racing world championships. With 10 Grand Prix victories to his credit, he is ranked fourth for the most Grand Prix wins by an Australian behind Mick Doohan (54 wins), Casey Stoner (38) and Wayne Gardner (18).

After his international motorcycle racing career, Hansford returned to Australia and established himself as a competitive driver in Australian touring car competitions. Hansford's 1993 Bathurst victory gave him the unique distinction of winning a race at the Mount Panorama Circuit in both motorcycle and automobile racing events. He died in an accident during a Supertouring race at the Phillip Island Grand Prix Circuit in 1995.

Racing career

Motorcycles
Hansford began racing motorcycles in Australia, winning the 1973 500cc Unlimited title, as well as competing in the New Zealand Marlboro Series in 1975/76 and 1977/78 on Team Kawasaki 750s. He also won one leg of the 77/78 series on a KR250. In 1978 he traveled to Europe to compete in Grand Prix motorcycle racing for the Kawasaki factory racing team. Hansford finished second to his Kawasaki teammate, Kork Ballington, in the world 250cc championship and third in the world 350cc championship in 1978. In 1979 he again finished 2nd in 250cc and 3rd in 350cc. In 1980 he teamed with Eddie Lawson to finish second in the Suzuka 8 Hours event, but suffered severe injuries in 1981 at the Belgian Grand Prix at Spa forcing his retirement from motorcycle racing.

Touring Cars
Hansford then turned to touring car racing in 1982 with Allan Moffat Racing. He had previous ties to the Moffat team and was actually entered to partner Colin Bond in the second Moffat Ford Dealers Ford Falcon in the 1977 Hardie-Ferodo 1000. However, a motorcycle racing crash caused injuries which saw Hansford forced to withdraw from the race and be replaced by open wheel driver Alan Hamilton. The car he was to drive with Bond finished second in Ford's famous 1–2 victory at Bathurst in 1977.

Hansford's first touring car race was in the second Moffat Mazda RX-7 at the 1982 Sandown 500 driving with young open wheel hot shoe Lucio Cesario. After the car failed to finish at Sandown, the pair were to drive the car in the 1982 James Hardie 1000 at Bathurst but a practice crash by Cesario saw them as non-starters in the race. Hansford then put in some good performances in the Mazda in the 1983 Australian Touring Car Championship. His first ATCC race was in Round 6 at Surfers Paradise where he qualified a surprising 3rd behind Moffat and Brock and after missing a gear at the start and dropping to 11th at the first turn, put in a great drive to finish in 3rd place. He then finished in 6th place at Oran Park before finishing second to Peter Brock's Holden Dealer Team Commodore in the wet final round at Lakeside in Brisbane (Moffat finished 3rd to clinch his 4th ATCC). He then went and qualified 12th in the Mazda at the 1983 James Hardie 1000 (Moffat qualified his car 14th), though problems saw him and co-driver Garry Waldon not classified as finishers after only completing 49 laps. Moffat and Japanese driver Yoshimi Katayama finished second outright.

Hansford's first touring car win was the 1984 Oran Park 250 in the 1984 Australian Endurance Championship with team boss Allan Moffat in the RX-7. Moffat, who was making his comeback to racing after a crash earlier in the year at Surfers Paradise, started the race from pole and although suffering from the flu handed the car to Hansford in the lead ahead of 1984 ATCC winner Dick Johnson in his Ford XE Falcon, a lead the former Grand Prix Motorcycle star would not lose. Later the pair finished second in the Mazda at the Castrol 500 at Sandown before they went on to finish third at the 1984 James Hardie 1000 at Bathurst. The Moffat team entered two cars for the race with Hansford listed in both cars alongside "The Boss". Hansford won a number of fans by qualifying his RX-7 in 8th place and it was his car (which the team admitted was not meant to run the full race) that crossed the line 3rd after Moffat's own car had been retired with overheating on lap 15.

After Australian touring car racing changed from the locally developed Group C rules to the international Group A rules in 1985, Hansford was forced to look elsewhere as Mazda (nor Moffat for the season) wouldn't be competing. Though at the start of 1985, the Moffat team took their Mazda RX-7, along with Peter McLeod and Kevin Bartlett to drive in the 24 Hours of Daytona. After Moffat qualified the car 38th in the GT class, they progressed through to the top 5 in their class before engine problems saw them drop back to 24th outright at the end of the race.

Hansford then teamed with Moffat's former teammate Colin Bond to drive an Alfa Romeo GTV6 to eighth outright and first in Class B in the 1985 James Hardie 1000. The following year he joined fellow Queenslander Dick Johnson in a Ford Mustang GT and finished the 1986 James Hardie 1000 in fourth outright.

Gregg Hansford stayed with Dick Johnson Racing for the 1987 season, with the team running two new Ford Sierra RS Cosworth's in the 1987 Australian Touring Car Championship. The team endured a tough season with the fast but fragile turbo Sierras which were upgraded to the more reliable, and much more powerful RS500 version for the endurance races. The 1987 James Hardie 1000 was a disaster for the team with the Johnson/Hansford car retiring from the race with diff failure after just 3 laps, while the team's second car retired one lap earlier after Neville Crichton crashed with the Holden Commodore of Larry Perkins.

Hansford was told by Dick Johnson at that year's Jack Newton Celebrity Pro-Am that he won't be driving for DJR in the 1988 Australian Touring Car season and was replaced with former dual Australian Drivers' Champion John Bowe. He again linked with Allan Moffat and the pair went on to win the Enzed 500 at Sandown driving a Ruedi Eggenberger built Ford Sierra RS500. The pair were joined by Eggenberger's ace West German driver Klaus Niedzwiedz at the 1988 Tooheys 1000 at Bathurst (with Eggenberger himself engineering the car for the race), and were leading by almost a lap on lap 129 when the car suffered engine failure with Hansford at the wheel (the turbocharged engine suffered a head gasket failure).

Hansford would drive the RS500 Sierras for both Allan Moffat and Glenn Seton Racing in both the ATCC and at Bathurst over the next four seasons, though on-track results would elude him.

He then finished 2nd at the 1993 James Hardie 12 Hour with Charlie O'Brien in a Mazda RX-7 and won the 1994 James Hardie 12 Hour with television commentator turned race driver Neil Crompton, again in an RX-7. Such performances earned him further respect and drives in both V8 Supercars and Super Touring, with highlights being 1st in the 1993 Tooheys 1000, 3rd in the 1994 Tooheys 1000 and 3rd in the 1994 Sandown 500 all partnered with Larry Perkins in a Holden VP Commodore.

Hansford's 1993 Bathurst win gave him the unique distinction of winning a race at the Mount Panorama Circuit in both motorcycle and car racing.

Death
While competing in a Supertouring race in 1995 at Phillip Island, Hansford's Ford Mondeo slid off the track and hit a tyre wall at high speed. The car bounced back onto the track where he was hit by Mark Adderton's Peugeot 405 at over 200 km/h. Hansford died moments after the impact. At the time of his death, his youngest son Harrison, born to model Carolyn Donovan, was only 8 months old.

In 2007, Hansford's older sons from his marriage to Julie-Anne, Ryan and Rhys had made their first steps into a motor racing career and Ryan presently (2013) competes in V8 Utes. Ryan previously competed in the Australian Mini Challenge.
 
Hansford is buried in Brisbane's Pinnaroo Lawn Cemetery.

Career summary

Motorcycle Grand Prix results
Source:

(key) (Races in bold indicate pole position; races in italics indicate fastest lap)

Car Racing

Complete Australian Touring Car Championship results
(key) (Races in bold indicate pole position) (Races in italics indicate fastest lap)

Complete World Touring Car Championship results
(key) (Races in bold indicate pole position) (Races in italics indicate fastest lap)

† Not registered for series & points

Complete Asia-Pacific Touring Car Championship results
(key) (Races in bold indicate pole position) (Races in italics indicate fastest lap)

Complete Bathurst 1000 results

Complete 24 Hours of Daytona results

Complete Sandown 400/500 results

Complete Bathurst 12 Hour results

References

1952 births
1995 deaths
Motorcycle racers from Brisbane
Australian motorcycle racers
Australian rally drivers
Supercars Championship drivers
250cc World Championship riders
350cc World Championship riders
Racing drivers who died while racing
Sport deaths in Australia
Accidental deaths in Victoria (Australia)
Bathurst 1000 winners
Australian Touring Car Championship drivers
Racing drivers from Queensland
Burials at Pinnaroo Cemetery, Brisbane
Australian Endurance Championship drivers
Dick Johnson Racing drivers